Shish Gumbad ("glazed dome"), also spelt Shisha Gumbad, is a tomb from the Lodhi Dynasty and is thought to have possibly been constructed between 1489 and 1517 CE. The Shish Gumbad (glass dome) houses graves, whose occupants are not unequivocally identifiable.

Shish Gumbad is situated in the Lodhi Gardens in Delhi and the area where the tomb is situated was formally called village Khairpur.

History
Exact date of construction of Shish Gumbad is not known. There are four monuments (tombs) in the Lodhi Gardens including the Shish Gumbad. The oldest of the four tombs is the tomb of Muhammad Shah (who belonged to the Sayyid dynasty). Shah's tomb was constructed in 1444 CE by Ala-ud-din Alam Shah. During the rule of Sikander Lodhi, the Bara Gumbad and adjacent mosque were constructed. Sikander Lodhi's tomb was built by Ibrahim Lodhi in 1517. The Shish Gumbad is said to have been constructed between 1489-1517 CE by Ibrahim Lodhi.

Among historians there is no agreement, who are the occupants of the graves inside the structure.

Initially, all the monuments were built independently and were not in one confine. In early 20th century, a park was developed which was inaugurated by Lady Willingdon on 9 Apr 1936 bringing the four monuments in one confine.

Construction
Constructed between 1489-1517 CE, the Shish Gumbad is constructed in square shape. Combination of bracket and lintel beams, the architecture is a blend of Islamic and Indian architectures. Although the Gumbad has an external semblance of spanning in two floors, the structure made only in one floor. The western wall of the Gumbad consists of mihrab which also served as a mosque. The main chamber of the monument measures .

The ceiling is decorated with plaster work that contains Quranic inscriptions and floral designs. The monument was originally decorated with blue enamelled tiles that shined like glass. The Gumbad hence got its name "Shish Gumbad". The blue tile embellishment presently only remains on top of the main frontage in traces.

Location
The Shish Gumbad is located in and is a part of the Lodhi Gardens in Delhi, India. The village, where the monument stands was earlier called Khairpur. The garden is bounded by Amrita Shergill Marg in the West, North-West and North, Max MuellerMarg on the East and Lodhi Road on the South Side. Safdarjang Tomb is situated on South-West corner of the Lodhi Garden.

Picture gallery

See also

 Bara Gumbad
 Lodhi Gardens
 Tomb of Bahlul Lodi
 Tomb of Sikandar Lodi
 Ibrahim Lodhi's Tomb
 List of Monuments of National Importance in Delhi

References 

Burial sites of the Lodi dynasty
Architecture of the Lodi dynasty
Mausoleums in Delhi
Monuments of National Importance in Delhi